Magnus II; Swedish: Magnus Henriksson (c. 1130 – 1161) was a Danish lord and king of Sweden between 1160 and 1161. He is often seen by posterity as a usurper.

Background 

The mother of Magnus was Ingrid Ragvaldsdotter, a granddaughter of King Inge I of Sweden. His father was the Danish lord Henrik Skatelår, son of an illegitimate son of king Sweyn II of Denmark. After Henrik's death, Ingrid remarried thrice, with Harald Gille of Norway, then Ottar Birting, and finally Arne from Stårheim. Magnus therefore had kinship ties with the royalty of the three Nordic kingdoms. He was married to his stepsister Bridget Haraldsdotter, a daughter of Harald Gille who had previously been married to the powerful jarl in Västergötland, Karl Sunesson. Magnus is first mentioned in 1148 when he witnessed a document issued by King Sweyn III of Denmark.

Reign 

Magnus was a claimant to the throne of Sweden, which was much-contested at the time. In 1156 he allegedly bribed a trusted servant of King Sverker I to assassinate him. A few years later, according to a legendary source, he allied with a certain chief in the country, possibly Sverker's son Karl. He then ambushed and killed Eric IX of Sweden (later to be known as Eric the Saint) when  he left the church at Östra Aros near Uppsala on May 18, 1160. After this feat Magnus reigned as king over most of Sweden, but apparently not Östergötland, which was ruled by Karl Sverkersson since c. 1158. He is, however, mentioned in the short chronicle of the Westrogothic law, implying that he was recognized in Västergötland. Magnus appointed his brother Ragnvald as jarl and provided refuge to his uterine brother Orm when their brother King Inge the Hunchback was killed in Norway. Otherwise not much is known about his reign, except that he donated land to Vreta Abbey.

Magnus merely reigned for a year. According to the 15th-century historian Ericus Olai, some retainers of Eric the Saint survived the assault in Östra Aros and fled to the north, to Helsingland, where they propagated against the usurper-king. Dissatisfaction with the regicide among the Swedish peasantry soon led to a rising against Magnus. The near-contemporary Saxo Grammaticus, on the other hand, writes that "he fell in a battle that he fought against Sverker's son Karl, whom he also intended to deprive of his crown, after he had first deprived him of his father." Saxo regarded the violent death of Magnus as the divine revenge for the shameful assassination of Sverker. According to Swedish sources the battle took place in Örebro in 1161. After the fall of Magnus, Karl Sverkersson reigned as King Charles VII of Sweden . His full brothers Knut and Buris served as jarls in the court of Valdemar the Great of Denmark. His uterine brother Nikolas Arnesson was Bishop of Oslo, and an opponent of Sverre of Norway, the son-in-law of Eric IX. Queen Bridget later remarried with the powerful jarl Birger Brosa (d. 1202) and became the ancestress of a branch of the House of Bjälbo, and the grandmother of John I of Sweden.

References

Literature
 Gillingstam, Hans, "Magnus Henriksson", Svenskt biografiskt lexikon, https://sok.riksarkivet.se/Sbl/Presentation.aspx?id=10155
 Saxo Grammaticus, Danmarks krønike. København: Asschenfeldt's, 1985.
 Tunberg, Sven, Sveriges historia till våra dagar. Andra delen: Äldre medeltiden. Stockholm: P.A. Norstedt & Söners Förlag, 1926.
 Yngre Västgötalagen, http://project2.sol.lu.se/fornsvenska/

External links

1161 deaths
12th-century Swedish monarchs
House of Estridsen
House of Stenkil
Year of birth unknown
Burials at Vreta Abbey
Year of birth uncertain
Swedish military personnel killed in action
Monarchs killed in action